The introduction in Scotland of the reformed examinations system in 2000 was criticised in the press and by the Government after a series of administrative and computer errors led to several thousand incorrect Higher and Intermediate certificates being sent out by post. The crisis took several months to resolve, and several management figures including the Chief Executive, Ron Tuck, resigned or lost their jobs as a result.

Timeline 

26 June 2000
The Scottish Qualifications Authority announces 'teething problems' with the marking system, but promises that students will receive their results on time.

9 August 2000
The Scottish Qualifications Authority publicly admits that pupils sitting Higher Grade examinations may not receive the correct results.

10 August 2000
Thousands of students across Scotland receive incomplete or inaccurate exam results. Schools are left in disarray as 5% of all schools have not been sent any results at all, accurate or otherwise.

12 August 2000
Ron Tuck, the Chief Executive of the Scottish Qualifications Authority, resigns, stating his regret and accepting responsibility for "this unfortunate episode". The Labour/Liberal Democrat coalition Scottish Executive ignores demands by the Scottish National Party for Sam Galbraith, the Education Minister, to resign.

13 August 2000
The Scottish Qualifications Authority and Scottish Executive claim that the errors are due to the correct results being incorrectly collated, due to a serious fault in the new computer programme, not exams being marked wrongly in the first place.

14 August 2000
Bill Morton is appointed as acting Chief Executive, to replace Ron Tuck, who resigned.

15 August 2000
Students are assured that their marks will not go down. However this leaves a problem for UCAS, who has no way of knowing if students with high grades actually earned them or not. UCAS accepted the validity of all results.

18 August 2000
UCAS admits in a statement that many of the students whose certificates contained errors could lose out on a university place that they would have received had the results been accurate and on time.

20 August 2000
The Scottish Qualifications Authority claims that over 2,000 students with inaccurate certificates will receive the correct ones the next day, and the rest will be fixed 'in a matter of days.'

22 August 2000
Now realising that 21 August was not a realistic deadline, the Scottish Qualifications Authority vow to sort out the worst affected pupils' results by 20 September 2000.

27 August 2000
The Scottish Qualifications Authority sorts out Higher Grade exam results.

28 August 2000
Bill Morton orders an internal investigation at the Scottish Qualifications Authority.

29 August 2000
Over 4,000 Standard Grade students are discovered to have received incorrect certificates.

29 October 2000
Jack McConnell becomes the new Education Minister. Sam Galbraith is removed to Environment Minister.

31 October 2000
A leak reveals that the Scottish Qualifications Authority failed to sort out non-urgent Higher Grade exam results within the planned deadline—and the new Chief Executive was not told.

9 November 2000
Jack McConnell appoints a new Scottish Qualifications Authority board. 16 of the 24 members have been replaced.

25 November 2000
The Scottish Qualifications Authority begins sending out accurate exam certificates to students—three months after they were supposed to be delivered.

10 August 2001
Media reports suggest that the exam results fiasco cost the people of Scotland over £11,000,000.

10 January 2002

It emerged that an eighteen-year-old student has decided to sue the Scottish Qualifications Authority for compensation after she spent her time retaking a subject she had passed in, but wasn't notified about it until nine months later.

References

External links
The full report to the Scottish Parliament of the difficulties experienced in 2000.

2000 in Scotland
Education in Scotland
Political history of Scotland
Political scandals in Scotland
History of the Labour Party (UK)
History of the Liberal Democrats (UK)
Scottish Labour
Scottish Liberal Democrats
Education controversies in the United Kingdom